John Heard may refer to:

 John Heard (actor) (1946–2017), American actor
 John Heard (basketball) (born 1939), Australian Olympic basketball player
 John Heard (musician) (born 1938), jazz bassist
 John T. Heard (1840–1927), American politician
 John W. Heard (1860–1922), American army general
 John Isaac Heard (1787–1862), Irish Member of the UK Parliament for Kinsale

See also
 Johnny Herd (born 1989), English footballer
 John Hurd (1914–2001), fencer
 John Hurt (1940–2017), English actor